Yarragon is a town in the Shire of Baw Baw in the West Gippsland region of Victoria, Australia. The town lies on the Princes Highway and the main Gippsland Railway line approximately halfway between the major towns of Warragul and Moe. Hills of the Strzelecki Ranges rise over  immediately to the south of the town, providing a spectacular backdrop, while the Moe River and the lowlands lie to the north and east.

History
The town was a centre for dairy farms in the vicinity (a former dairy factory lies to the north of the railway line), as well as logging activities in the heavily forested hills to the south. The Post Office opened around October 1878 as Waterloo, Gippsland and was renamed Yarragon in 1883.

Today
Significant expansion of facilities and businesses along Yarragon's main Princes Highway streetscape since the 1990s aimed at capitalising on the tourist potential of passing traffic has resulted in the town being informally dubbed 'Yarragon Village'.

The town has its own railway station on the Bairnsdale railway line. The station is unstaffed and its buildings are 100 years old as of April 2012. the two platform station used to also be home to rail yards and storage for track gangs.

Yarragon has an Australian rules football team, known as the Power (formerly the Panthers), competing in the Mid Gippsland Football League which won the Under 18's Premiership in 2013 and the Under 16's in 2012. Yarragon is also home to the Yarragon Netball Club.

Media

Newspapers

Yarragon has two weekly local newspapers, The Warragul and Drouin Gazette and a free publication, The West Gippsland Trader. According to the Warragul Regional Newspapers website, The Gazette and The Trader are distributed to locations from as far as Pakenham to Moe and from Poowong to Noojee covering over 40,000 readers.

Yarragon is also serviced by free monthly tabloid and online newspaper the Warragul & Baw Baw Citizen. The paper was established as The Warragul Citizen in 2011 as a quarterly print paper before becoming bimonthly in 2012, covering Warragul, Drouin and Yarragon. The paper's online news offering started in late 2011, covering all of Baw Baw. The paper moved to being online-only in 2013, before returning to print in its present form in July 2014.

Radio

Warragul Radio stations Triple M Gippsland and 3GG service this region.

References

External links

Yarragon community website

Towns in Victoria (Australia)
Shire of Baw Baw